"Both Sides, Now" is a song by Joni Mitchell.

Both Sides Now may also refer to:

 Both Sides Now (Joni Mitchell album), 2000
 Both Sides Now (Adam Harvey album), 2009
 Both Sides Now (Marina Prior album), 2012
 Both Sides Now (Willie Nelson album), 1970
 "Both Sides Now", a song from the Sammy Hagar album Marching to Mars, 1997
 "Both Sides Now" (House), television series episode
 "Both Sides Now", an episode of the US TV series Outlander
 "Both Sides Now", an episode of the US TV series Supergirl (season 3)
 "Both Sides Now", an episode of the US TV series Counterpart